Machine is a 2006 American action movie written and directed by Michael Lazar, and starring Lazar, James Russo and Neal McDonough.

 
The film had theatrical debut October 29, 2006.

Plot 
Ex special forces mercenary and now hardened criminal Vic, (Michael Lazar) lives in a world of cons, double crosses, crooked cops, mob bosses and drug dealing crime lords. Playing by his own rules, Vic and his partner Frank (Paul Sloan) work both sides of the street, caring only about where they can score and take down the most cash. After a dangerous shootout during a drug deal gone bad, Vic finds himself working for ruthless crime boss Paul Santo (Nick Vallelonga). Santo's being indicted for murder, and he enlists Vic and Frank to kill the three witnesses that will testify against him. Watching Vic's every move is Santo's strongest soldier, Ray, (Michael Madsen) a stone-cold killer, who would like nothing better than to whack Vic and Frank the moment his boss gives him the okay. As the Asian proverb says, "In the shadow of every crime is a woman" and that holds true for Vic as his grifter girlfriend Thea (Lisa Arturo) and Frank's ex, the exotic, sultry, Layla (Michelle Lombardo) have their own agendas as they both try in their own way to use and manipulate their men. As Vic tries to juggle all this as well as kill the witnesses to pay off his debt to Santo, and at the same time avoid Ray's wrath, he is pursued by crooked vice cop Ford (Neal McDonough) who's relentless as he turns up the heat on Vic and Frank. On top of all this, it doesn't help that Asian crime lord, Cho (Garret Sato) and his henchman Butch (James Russo) are applying their own brand of pressure on Vic and Frank. They want to take out Santo and Ray, using Vic and Frank as pawns in their game of revenge and murder. In the end, Vic settles all scores as these competing factions come crashing together in the violent, action-packed climax.

Cast
 Michael Lazar as Vic
 Michael Madsen as Ray
 Neal McDonough as Detective Ford
 James Russo as Butch
 Michelle Lombardo as Layla
 Terasa Livingstone as Vivian
 Paul Sloan as Frank
 Lisa Arturo as Thea
 Nick Vallelonga as Paul Santo
 Brian Hayes Currie as "Top"
 Garret Sato as Cho
 Robert Berson as Rich
 Jess King as Banes
 Robert Ciancimino as Kane
 Jimmy Labrie as Davis
 Hadi Armani as Raheed

Reception

(Expand per
Film Monthly,
 eFilmCritic, Film Critics United, and Home Theater Info.)

References

External links 
 

2006 action films
American action films
2000s English-language films
2000s American films
English-language action films